The 2020 Thai League Cup was the 11th season in the second era of a Thailand's knockout football competition. All rounds were played in a single-leg format. The tournament, known as the Toyota League Cup, was sponsored by Toyota. 85 clubs were accepted into the tournament, and it began with the first qualification round on 22 February 2020. The tournament has been readmitted back into Thai football after a 10-year absence. The prize money for this prestigious award was said to be around 5 million baht for the tournament winners, and 1 million baht for the second-place team.

This was the first edition of the competition with the qualifying rounds played in regions featuring clubs from Thai League 3 and Thai League 4.

On 5 August 2020, Football Association of Thailand cancelled the 2020 League Cup due to COVID-19 pandemic, and the main sponsor Toyota's withdrawal of support for the tournament due to the economic impact of the pandemic.

Calendar

Results
Note: T1: Clubs from Thai League 1; T2: Clubs from Thai League 2; T3: Clubs from Thai League 3; T4: Clubs from Thai League 4.

First qualification round
There were 17 clubs from 2020 Thai League 3 and 27 clubs from 2020 Thai League 4 have signed to first qualifying in 2020 Thai League cup. This round had drawn on 6 February 2020.

Northern region
 The qualifying round was played in the northern region, featuring 4 clubs from the 2020 Thai League 4 Northern Region and 4 clubs from the 2020 Thai League 3 Upper Region.

Northeastern region
 The qualifying round was played in the northeastern region, featuring 6 clubs from the 2020 Thai League 4 Northeastern Region and 2 clubs from the 2020 Thai League 3 Upper Region.

Eastern region
 The qualifying round was played in the eastern region, featuring 5 clubs from the 2020 Thai League 4 Eastern Region, 2 clubs from the 2020 Thai League 3 Upper Region, and 1 club from the 2020 Thai League 3 Lower Region.

Bangkok metropolitan region
 The qualifying round was played in Bangkok metropolitan region featuring 2 clubs from the 2020 Thai League 4 Bangkok Metropolitan Region, 1 club from the 2020 Thai League 3 Upper Region, and 3 clubs from the 2020 Thai League 3 Lower Region.

Southern region
 The qualifying round would have been played in the southern region, featuring 7 clubs from the 2020 Thai League 4 Southern Region and 3 clubs from the 2020 Thai League 3 Lower Region.

Second qualification round
The second qualifying round would have featured 22 clubs, which were the winners of the first qualification round (10 clubs from T3 and 12 clubs from T4) and the new entries including 2 clubs from the 2020 Thai League 3 and 6 clubs from the 2020 Thai League 4.

Northern region
 The second qualifying round would be played in the northern region featured by 4 clubs which were the winners of the first qualification round (2 clubs from T3 and 2 clubs from T4) and the new entries including 2 clubs from the 2020 Thai League 4 Northern Region.

Northeastern region
 The second qualifying round would be played in the northeastern region featured by 4 clubs which were the winners of the first qualification round (2 clubs from T3 and 2 clubs from T4).

Eastern region
 The second qualifying round would be played in the eastern region featured by 4 clubs which were the winners of the first qualification round (1 club from T3 and 3 clubs from T4) and the new entries including 2 clubs from the 2020 Thai League 4 Eastern Region.

Western region
 The second qualifying round would be played in the western region featured by 2 clubs which were the winners of the first qualification round (1 club from T3 and 1 club from T4).

Bangkok metropolitan region
 The second qualifying round would be played in the Bangkok metropolitan region featured by 3 clubs which were the winners of the first qualification round (1 club from T3 and 2 clubs from T4) and the new entries including 2 clubs from the 2020 Thai League 4 Bangkok Metropolitan Region and 1 club from the 2020 Thai League 3 Lower Region.

Southern region
 The second qualifying round would be played in the southern region featured by 5 clubs which were the winners of the first qualification round (3 clubs from T3 and 2 clubs from T4) and the new entry that is a club from the 2020 Thai League 3 Lower Region.

See also
 2020–21 Thai League 1
 2020–21 Thai League 2
 2020–21 Thai League 3
 2020–21 Thai League 3 Northern Region
 2020–21 Thai League 3 Northeastern Region
 2020–21 Thai League 3 Eastern Region
 2020–21 Thai League 3 Western Region
 2020–21 Thai League 3 Southern Region
 2020–21 Thai League 3 Bangkok Metropolitan Region
 2020–21 Thai League 3 National Championship
 2020–21 Thai FA Cup
 2020 Thailand Champions Cup

References

External links
 Thai League official website
 Toyota League Cup official Facebook page

2020 in Thai football cups
Thailand League Cup
2020
2020
Thai League Cup, 2020